Ernst Gräfenberg (26 September 1881 – 28 October 1957) was a German-born physician and scientist. He is known for developing the intra-uterine device (IUD), and for his studies of the role of the woman's urethra in orgasm. The G-spot is named after him.

Career
Gräfenberg studied medicine in Göttingen and Munich, earning his doctorate on 10 March 1905. He began working as a doctor of ophthalmology at the university of Würzburg, but then moved to the Department of Obstetrics and Gynaecology at the University of Kiel, where he published papers on cancer metastasis (the "Gräfenberg theory"), and the physiology of egg implantation. In 1910 Gräfenberg worked as a gynaecologist in Berlin, and by 1920 was quite successful, with an office on the Kurfürstendamm. He was chief gynaecologist of a municipal hospital in Britz, a working-class Berlin district, and was beginning scientific studies of the physiology of human reproduction at Berlin University.

During the First World War, he was a medical officer, and continued publishing papers, mostly on human female physiology. In 1929 he published his studies of the "Gräfenberg ring", the first IUD for which there are usage records.

17th-century, Dutch physician Regnier de Graaf described female ejaculation and referred to an erogenous zone in the vagina that he linked with the male prostate; this zone was later reported by Gräfenberg. The term "G-Spot" was coined by Addiego et al. in 1981, named after Gräfenberg, even though Gräfenberg's 1940s research was dedicated to urethral stimulation. In 1950, Gräfenberg stated, "An erotic zone always could be demonstrated on the anterior wall of the vagina along the course of the urethra."

When Nazis assumed power in Germany, Gräfenberg, a Jew, was forced in 1933 to resign as head of the department of gynaecology and obstetrics in the Berlin-Britz municipal hospital. In 1934, Hans Lehfeldt attempted to persuade him to leave Nazi Germany; he refused, believing that since his practice included wives of high Nazi officials, he would be safe. He was wrong and was arrested in 1937 for having smuggled out a valuable stamp from Germany. On 9 November 1938 he was sentenced to three years imprisonment by the Landgericht Berlin and received a large fine for this alleged offense. Until 15 August 1940 he was imprisoned in the Brandenburg-Görden Prison. Margaret Sanger ransomed him from Nazi prison, whereupon he went to the U.S. and opened a practice in New York City. Among others, the German novelist Erich Maria Remarque helped Gräfenberg to build his new existence in the U.S.

Private life
Gräfenberg was born in Adelebsen near Göttingen, Germany, the son of Salomon Gräfenberg (1834–1918) and Minna Gräfenberg (née Eichenberg; 1845–1910). Ernst's father owned an iron wares business in Adelebsen and served as the head of the Jewish community there from 1868 to 1882, and as an Adelebsen community council member (Bürgervorsteher) from 1889 to 1893.

Gräfenberg was briefly married to writer Rosie Waldeck. He died largely unnoticed on 28 October 1957 in New York City, but the Jewish weekly Aufbau published an obituary. He was buried on the Ferncliff Cemetery.

References

External links
 Ernst Gräfenberg: From Berlin to New York by Beverly Whipple, Ph.D, RN, FAAN Professor Rutgers, The State University of New Jersey, USA
 The Role of Urethra in Female Orgasm by Ernest Gräfenberg, M.D.

1881 births
1957 deaths
American people of German-Jewish descent
German gynaecologists
Jewish emigrants from Nazi Germany to the United States
German sexologists
Jewish American scientists
Ludwig Maximilian University of Munich alumni
People from the Province of Hanover
University of Göttingen alumni
Academic staff of the University of Kiel
German military personnel of World War I